(James) Ian Stewart Macpherson, 1st Baron Strathcarron  (14 May 1880 – 14 August 1937), known as Sir Ian Macpherson, 1st Baronet, between 1933 and 1936, was a British lawyer and Liberal politician. In 1931 he joined the breakway National Liberal Party.

Background and education
Macpherson was the son of James Macpherson, JP, of Inverness, and Anne, daughter of James Stewart. Lord Drumalbyn, George Macpherson and Sir Tommy Macpherson were his nephews. He was educated at the University of Edinburgh and was called to the Bar, Middle Temple, in 1906.

Political career
Macpherson sat as Member of Parliament for Ross and Cromarty from 1911 to 1935. In 1916 he was appointed Under-Secretary of State for War, a post he held until 1918, and then served as Deputy Secretary of State for War and Vice-President of the Army Council between 1918 and 1919, as Chief Secretary for Ireland between 1919 and 1920 and as Minister of Pensions between 1920 and 1922. He was admitted to the British Privy Council in 1918 and to the Irish Privy Council in 1919 and made a King's Counsel in 1919. He was created a Baronet, of Banchor in the County of Inverness, in 1933 and raised to the peerage as Baron Strathcarron, of Banchor in the County of Inverness, in 1936.

Family
Lord Strathcarron married Jill, daughter of Sir George Rhodes, 1st Baronet, in 1915. They had one son and two daughters. He died in London in August 1937, aged 57, and was cremated at Golders Green Crematorium. He was succeeded in his titles by his son, David. Lady Strathcarron remarried in 1938, to Hedley Ernest Le Bas, son of Hedley Le Bas, and died in August 1956.

Arms

References

Strathcarron, Ian Macpherson, 1st Baron
Strathcarron, Ian Macpherson, 1st Baron
Strathcarron, Ian Macpherson, 1st Baron
Strathcarron
Scottish Liberal Party MPs
National Liberal Party (UK, 1922) politicians
National Liberal Party (UK, 1931) politicians
Members of the Parliament of the United Kingdom for Scottish constituencies
Members of the Privy Council of the United Kingdom
Members of the Privy Council of Ireland
UK MPs 1910–1918
UK MPs 1918–1922
UK MPs 1922–1923
UK MPs 1923–1924
UK MPs 1924–1929
UK MPs 1929–1931
UK MPs 1931–1935
UK MPs 1935–1945
UK MPs who were granted peerages
Chief Secretaries for Ireland
20th-century King's Counsel
Members of the Middle Temple